Casearia mauritiana is a species of flowering plant in the family Salicaceaey. It is endemic to Mauritius.

References

mauritiana
Critically endangered plants
Endemic flora of Mauritius
Taxonomy articles created by Polbot